Pallacanestro Varese, also called by its current sponsor's name, the Openjobmetis Varese, is an Italian professional basketball club based in Varese, Lombardy. Founded in 1945, the team plays in the Italian first division LBA.

For past club sponsorship names, see sponsorship names.

History

Basketball was introduced in Varese in 1945, with the creation of the historical club, Pallacanestro Varese. The first sponsors were introduced 8 years later in 1954, including Storm and Ignis, followed by Emerson, Turisanda, Cagiva, Star, Ciaocrem, Divarese, Ranger, Metis, Whirlpool, and the most recent, Cimberio. Varese is also famous due to the lack of its having a main sponsor in the mid-1990s (something unusual in the Italian basketball league), and the choice of its franchise name, the Varese Roosters.

Since their creation, Pallancanestro Varese has won 10 Italian first-tier level LBA titles, in the years 1961, 1964, 1969, 1970, 1971, 1973, 1974, 1977, 1978, and their last Italian League title, won 21 years after the previous title, in 1999. With 10 titles, Pallacanestro Varese is the third most winning team ever in the Italian League, after Olimpia Milano and Virtus Bologna.

As it is shown by its roll of honors, Varese was extremely competitive in the 1970s, when the club played in the European-wide first-tier level FIBA European Champions Cup (now called EuroLeague), and played in ten finals in a row, winning 5 of them, in the years 1970, 1972, 1973, 1975, and 1976. Between 1970 and 1975, the club was named Ignis Varese. What was the club's golden age had begun some years before, as Varese conquered the FIBA Intercontinental Cup in 1966, and repeated the same title 4 and 7 years later, in the middle of the club's greatest decade in 1970 and 1973. Varese accomplished the great feat of winning the Triple Crown, winning all the trophies available in 1973, with the legendary Professor Aca Nikolić as the team's head coach. Varese also won two championships of the European-wide first-tier level FIBA European Cup Winners' Cup, in 1967 and 1980, and four Italian Cups, in 1969, 1970, 1971, and 1973.

Varese's great age ended in the early nineties, when the team dropped down to the Italian second division. Soon, the club took its revenge, coming up once again to the Italian top-tier level league, and after 5 years time became the real team to watch in the Italian League's playoffs, as it succeeded in winning its historical 10th Italian League title in 1999, with Carlo Recalcati (who later coached the Italian national team), leading the way as the club's head coach. Varese has never repeated that triumph so far, but that success is still remembered to this day. Varese has been trying to return to the top of the Italian League and European-wide competitions in the years since.

Players

Current roster

Depth chart

Season by season

Honours 
Total titles: 25

Domestic competitions
 Italian League
 Winners (10): 1960–61, 1963–64, 1968–69, 1969–70, 1970–71, 1972–73, 1973–74, 1976–77, 1977–78, 1998–99
 Runners-up (10): 1948–49, 1961–62, 1962–63, 1964–65, 1965–66, 1966–67, 1971–72, 1974–75, 1975–76, 1989–90
 Italian Cup
 Winners (4): 1968–69, 1969–70, 1970–71, 1972–73
 Runners-up (5): 1971–72, 1984–85, 1987–88, 1998–99, 2012–13
 Italian Supercup
 Winners (1): 1999
 Runners-up (1): 2013

European competitions
 EuroLeague
 Winners (5): 1969–70, 1971–72, 1972–73, 1974–75, 1975–76
 Runners-up (5): 1970–71, 1973–74, 1976–77, 1977–78, 1978–79
 Semifinalists (1): 1964–65
 FIBA Saporta Cup (defunct)
 Winners (2): 1966–67, 1979–80
 Semifinalists (2): 1967–68, 1980–81
 FIBA Korać Cup (defunct)
 Runners-up (1): 1984–85
 Semifinalists (1): 1985–86
 FIBA Europe Cup
 Runners-up (1): 2015–16

Worldwide competitions
 FIBA Intercontinental Cup
 Winners (3): 1966, 1970, 1973
 Runners-up (4): 1967, 1974, 1976, 1977
 3rd place (1): 1979
 4th place (1): 1978
 McDonald's Championship
 4th place (1): 1999

Individual club awards
 Triple Crown
 Winners (2): 1969–70, 1972–73

International record

Notable players

  Ivan Bisson
  Paolo Conti
  Marcelo Damiao
  Fabrizio Della Fiori
  Giacomo Galanda
  Andrea Meneghin
  Dino Meneghin
  Aldo Ossola
  Gianmarco Pozzecco
  Stefano Rusconi
  Romeo Sacchetti
  Paolo Vittori
  Marino Zanatta
  Siim-Sander Vene
  Anthony Bowie
  Frank Brickowski
  Bill Campion
  Geno Carlisle
  Tim Bassett
  Toney Douglas 
  Derek Hamilton
  Delonte Holland
  Frank Johnson
  Jalen Jones 
  Anthony Gennari
  Kevin Magee
  Stan McKenzie
  Billy Keys
  Rusty LaRue
  Pat Cummings
  Bill Edwards
  Wes Matthews
  Jerry McCullough
  Larry Micheaux
  Corny Thompson
  Eddie Lee Wilkins
  Leon Wood
  Charlie Yelverton
  Reggie Theus
  Tyrone Nesby
  Charles Pittman
  Bob Morse
  DeJuan Collins
  Daniel Farabello
  Gabriel Fernández
  Luis Scola
  Arijan Komazec
  Mate Skelin
  Veljko Mršić
  Boris Gorenc
  Sani Bečirović
  Aleksandar Ćapin
  Alain Digbeu
  Kristjan Kangur
  Janar Talts
  Daniel Santiago
  Richard Petruška
  Pavel Podkolzin
  Manuel Raga
  Nikola Lončar
  Fedon Matheou
  D. J. Mbenga

Head coaches

  Vittorio Tracuzzi (1948–54)
  Valerio Giobbi (1954–55)
  Yogi Bough (1955–56)
  Enrico Garbosi (1956–62)
  Vittorio Tracuzzi (1954–55 & 1966–68)
  Nico Messina (1968–69 & 1977–78)
  Aleksandar Nikolić (1969–73)
  Sandro Gamba (1973–77)
  Edoardo Rusconi (1978–80, 1993–97 & 2003–04)
  Joe Isaac (1986–89 & 1992–93)
  Carlo Recalcati (1997–99 & 2010–12)
  Valerio Bianchini (1999 & 2007–08)
  Gianfranco Lombardi (2000–01)
  Grégor Beugnot (2001–03)
  Ruben Magnano (2004–07)
  Veljko Mršić (2007–08)
  Stefano Pillastrini (2008–10)
  Francesco Vitucci (2012–13)
  Fabrizio Frates (2013–14)
  Stefano Bizzozi (2014)
  Gianmarco Pozzecco (2014–15)
  Attilio Caja (2015 & 2016–20)
  Paolo Moretti (2015–16)
  Massimo Bulleri (2020–21)
  Adriano Vertemati (2021–22)
  Johan Roijakkers (2022)
  Alberto Seravalli (2022)
  Matt Brase (2022-present)

Sponsorship names 
Through the years, due to sponsorship deals, it has been also known as:

 Storm (1954–56)
 Ignis (1956–75)
 Mobilgirgi (1975–78)
 Emerson (1978–80)
 Turisanda (1980–81)
 Cagiva (1981–83)
 Star (1983–84)
 Ciao Crem (1984–85)
 Divarese (1985–89)
 Ranger (1989–92)

 Cagiva (1992–97)
 No name sponsorship (1997–99)
 Varese Roosters (1999–01)
 Metis (2001–04)
 Casti Group (2004–05)
 Whirlpool (2005–07)
 Cimberio (2007–2014)
 OpenjobMetis (2014–present)

Shirt sponsors and manufacturers

Colors and badge

References

External links

Official Website 
Eurobasket.com Team Page
Varese Fans Basket 

1946 establishments in Italy
Varese
Varese
EuroLeague-winning clubs
Sport in Varese